Bluffton is a city in Otter Tail County, Minnesota, United States, along the Leaf River.  The population was 210 at the 2020 census.

History
Bluffton was platted in 1880, and named for the bluffs on the nearby Leaf River. Bluffton was incorporated in 1903.

Geography

U.S. Route 10 serves as a main route in the community.

Demographics

2010 census
As of the census of 2010, there were 207 people, 79 households, and 54 families living in the city. The racial makeup of the city was 96.1% White, 0.5% Native American, 0.5% Asian, 0.5% from other races, and 2.4% from two or more races. Hispanic or Latino of any race were 1.4% of the population.

There were 79 households, of which 32.9% had children under the age of 18 living with them, 58.2% were married couples living together, 3.8% had a female householder with no husband present, 6.3% had a male householder with no wife present, and 31.6% were non-families. 27.8% of all households were made up of individuals, and 15.2% had someone living alone who was 65 years of age or older. The average household size was 2.62 and the average family size was 3.20.

The median age in the city was 33.9 years. 25.6% of residents were under the age of 18; 10.2% were between the ages of 18 and 24; 24.2% were from 25 to 44; 24.1% were from 45 to 64; and 15.9% were 65 years of age or older. The gender makeup of the city was 48.3% male and 51.7% female.

2000 census
As of the census of 2000, there were 210 people, 76 households, and 56 families living in the city. The racial makeup of the city was 99.05% White, and 0.95% from two or more races.

There were 76 households, out of which 46.1% had children under the age of 18 living with them, 65.8% were married couples living together, 5.3% had a female householder with no husband present, and 26.3% were non-families. 26.3% of all households were made up of individuals, and 13.2% had someone living alone who was 65 years of age or older.  The average household size was 2.68 and the average family size was 3.27.

In the city, the population was spread out, with 33.3% under the age of 18, 3.3% from 18 to 24, 31.0% from 25 to 44, 14.3% from 45 to 64, and 18.1% who were 65 years of age or older.  The median age was 34 years. For every 100 females, there were 89.2 males.  For every 100 females age 18 and over, there were 94.4 males.

The median income for a household in the city was $31,250, and the median income for a family was $33,958. Males had a median income of $28,125 versus $17,000 for females. The per capita income for the city was $12,105.  About 6.6% of families and 8.6% of the population were below the poverty line, including 11.1% of those under the age of eighteen and none of those 65 or over.

References

Cities in Minnesota
Cities in Otter Tail County, Minnesota